André Canonne (2 December 1937 – 13 August 1990) was a Belgian writer and librarian.

Early life 
André Canonne was born in the town of Wasmes in Belgium.

Career 
André Canonne held numerous jobs as a librarian and archivist. He provided assistance to the French department of public libraries.

He was the chief librarian of the central library of Hainaut.

He wrote a number of books on librarianship and management of books and information.

He was the guardian and promoter of Paul Otlet's Mundaneum institution.

Bibliography 

 Manuel élémentaire de catalographie (Ed. du CLPCF, 1986)
 Dis, donne moi une histoire : répertoire thématique d'albums de fictions pour enfants (Ed. du CLPCF, 1989 ; 
 Vocabulaire élémentaire des classifications (Ed. CEFAL, 1993)
 Traité de documentation : le livre sur le livre, théorie et pratique (Ed. du CLPCF, 1989 ; réimp. de l'éd. de 1934 ; Préface de Robert Estivals, Avant-propos d'André Canonne. )

References

External links 
 http://www.litteraturedejeunesse.cfwb.be/index.php
 http://bbf.enssib.fr/consulter/bbf-1995-05-0100-005

1937 births
1990 deaths
People from Colfontaine
Belgian non-fiction writers
Belgian male writers
Belgian librarians
20th-century non-fiction writers
Male non-fiction writers